Stanwood Wendell Partenheimer [Party] (October 21, 1922 – January 28, 1989) was a pitcher in Major League Baseball who played for the Boston Red Sox (1944) and St. Louis Cardinals (1945). He was born in Chicopee Falls, Massachusetts. His father, Steve Partenheimer, also was a major league player. 

In a two-season-career, Partenheimer posted a 6.91 ERA in nine appearances, including three starts, six strikeouts, 18 walks, and 14 innings of work without a decision.

Partenheimer spent the majority of his post-MLB career at Sewickley Academy and was named to their Hall of Fame.

Partenheimer's son, Hal, played professional soccer.

Partenheimer died in Wilson, North Carolina, at the age of 66.

See also
1944 Boston Red Sox season
1945 St. Louis Cardinals season
Cup of coffee
List of second-generation Major League Baseball players

References

External links

Retrosheet

Boston Red Sox players
St. Louis Cardinals players
Major League Baseball pitchers
Baseball players from Massachusetts
1922 births
1989 deaths
People from Chicopee, Massachusetts
Wooster Fighting Scots baseball players